Hemilissa is a genus of beetles in the family Cerambycidae, containing the following species:

 Hemilissa birai Galileo, Bezark & Santos-Silva, 2016
 Hemilissa catapotia Martins, 1976
 Hemilissa cornuta Bates, 1870
 Hemilissa emblema Martins, 1976
 Hemilissa fabulosa Martins, 1985
 Hemilissa gummosa (Perty, 1832)
 Hemilissa opaca Martins, 1976
 Hemilissa picturata Galileo & Martins, 2000
 Hemilissa quadrispinosa Gounelle, 1913
 Hemilissa rufa Melzer, 1934
 Hemilissa sulcicollis Bates, 1870
 Hemilissa undulaticollis Zajciw, 1960
 Hemilissa violascens (Perty, 1832)

References

Piezocerini